KFPW (1230 AM, "The Marshal") is a radio station broadcasting a talk radio format to the Fort Smith, Arkansas, area.  The station is licensed to Paris Broadcasting, Inc which is owned by William L. Pharis and Karen A. Pharis.

According to the station's website, KFPW began broadcasting in 1930.

References

External links
KFPW website

FPW